This is a list of stratigraphic units that are found in Austria.

Geologic formations of Austria